XSLT (Extensible Stylesheet Language Transformations) defines many elements to describe the transformations that should be applied to a document. This article lists some of these elements. For an introduction to XSLT, see the main article.

XSLT logic elements

Example XSLT stylesheet using logic elements

<xsl:stylesheet>
    <xsl:template match="//input">
        <xsl:variable name="type" select="@type"/>
        <xsl:variable name="name" select="@name"/>
        <xsl:if test="$type='text' or $type='password' or $type='radio' or $type='checkbox'">
            <xsl:choose>

                <xsl:when test="$type='radio'">
                    <xsl:if test="not(preceding-sibling::input[@type='radio'])">
                        <select name="{@name}">
                            <xsl:for-each select="../input[@name=$name]">
                                <option value="{@value}">
                                    <xsl:apply-templates/>
                                </option>
                            </xsl:for-each>
                        </select>
                    </xsl:if>
                </xsl:when>

                <xsl:when test="$type='text'">
                    <input name="{@name}" type="{@type}">
                        <xsl:apply-templates/>
                    </input>
                </xsl:when>

                <xsl:when test="$type='password'">
                    <input name="{@name}" type="{@type}">
                        <xsl:apply-templates/>
                    </input>
                </xsl:when>

            </xsl:choose>
        </xsl:if>
    </xsl:template>
</xsl:stylesheet>

XSLT file I/O elements

Client-side XSLT can be implemented in a browser by adding a line like the following to the source XML file, right after the root XML tag.

<?xml-stylesheet type="text/xsl" href="family.xsl"?>

This is described on the page http://www.xml.com/pub/a/2000/10/25/msie/index.html

Other XSLT semantics

Functions defined by XSLT
The following functions can occur in many XSLT attributes, such as xsl:value-of.select and xsl:for-each.select.

External links
 W3C XSLT 1.0 recommendation - Describes the whole syntax and semantics of XSLT 1.0
 W3C XSLT 2.0 recommendation
 XSLT Elements Reference - by W3Schools

References

XML-based standards